Charles Copeland may refer to:

 Charles Copeland Morse (1842–1900), businessman considered the "American Seed King"
 Charles Copeland (illustrator) (1858–1945), American book illustrator
 Charles L. Copeland (born 1963), Delaware businessman and politician
 Charles Townsend Copeland (1860–1952), Massachusetts-based poet and writer
 Charles C. Copeland, American infrastructure engineer

See also
 Charles Copeland Morse House, Morse's home, which is listed on the National Historic Register